Natasha Lynette Barbara Alleyne-Forte (born 12 July 1969) is a Trinidad and Tobago former athlete. She competed in the women's high jump at the 1996 Summer Olympics.

References

External links
 

1969 births
Living people
Athletes (track and field) at the 1996 Summer Olympics
Trinidad and Tobago female high jumpers
Trinidad and Tobago female triple jumpers
Olympic athletes of Trinidad and Tobago
Athletes (track and field) at the 1994 Commonwealth Games
Commonwealth Games competitors for Trinidad and Tobago
Athletes (track and field) at the 1995 Pan American Games
Athletes (track and field) at the 1999 Pan American Games
Pan American Games competitors for Trinidad and Tobago
Place of birth missing (living people)
Central American and Caribbean Games medalists in athletics